1,4-Naphthoquinone or para-naphthoquinone is a quinone derived from naphthalene.  It forms volatile yellow triclinic crystals and has a sharp odor similar to benzoquinone.  It  is almost insoluble in cold water, slightly soluble in petroleum ether, and more soluble in polar organic solvents.  In alkaline solutions it produces a reddish-brown color. Vitamin K is a derivative of 1,4-naphthoquinone.  It is a planar molecule with one aromatic ring fused to a quinone subunit.  It is an isomer of 1,2-naphthoquinone.

Preparation
The industrial synthesis involves aerobic oxidation of naphthalene over a vanadium oxide catalyst:
CH  +  3/2 O   →   CHO  +  HO
In the laboratory, naphthoquinone can be produced by the oxidation of a variety of naphthalene compounds.  An inexpensive route involves oxidation of naphthalene with chromium trioxide.

Reactions
1,4-Naphthoquinone acts as strong dienophile in Diels-Alder reaction. Its adduct with 1,3-butadiene can be prepared by two methods: 1) long (45 days) exposure of naphthoquinone in neat liquid butadiene taken in huge excess at room temperature in a thick-wall glass tube or 2) fast catalyzed cycloaddition at low temperature in the presence of 1 equivalent of tin(IV) chloride:

Uses
1,4-Naphthoquinone is mainly used as a precursor to anthraquinone by reaction with butadiene followed by oxidation.  Nitration gives 5-nitro-1,4-naphthalenedione, precursor to an  that is used as a dye precursor.

Derivatives
Naphthoquinone forms the central chemical structure of many natural compounds, most notably the K vitamins.  2-Methyl-1,4-naphthoquinone, called menadione, is a more effective coagulant than vitamin K.

Other natural naphthoquinones include juglone, plumbagin, droserone.

Naphthoquinone derivatives have significant pharmacological properties. They are cytotoxic, they have significant antibacterial, antifungal, antiviral, insecticidal, anti-inflammatory, and antipyretic properties. Plants with naphthoquinone content are widely used in China and the countries of South America, where they are used to treat malignant and parasitic diseases.

Naphthoquinone functions as a ligand through its electrophilic carbon-carbon double bonds.

Dichlone, a chlorinated derivative of 1,4-naphthoquinone, is used as a fungicide.

See also
Hydroxynaphthoquinone
1,4-Benzoquinone
Plumbagin
Hooker reaction

References

1,4-Naphthoquinones